Elliot Owen Hooper (born 22 March 1996) is an English cricketer. He made his first-class debut on 18 August 2019, for Sussex in the 2019 County Championship. He made his Twenty20 debut on 16 July 2021, for Kent in the 2021 T20 Blast.

References

External links
 

1996 births
Living people
English cricketers
Kent cricketers
Sussex cricketers
Sportspeople from Eastbourne
People educated at St Bede's School, Hailsham